Stanislas Nordey (born 1966) is a French actor and theatre director. He is the son of actress Véronique Nordey and film director Jean-Pierre Mocky.

Biography 
Nordey was born in Paris. After his studies at the Conservatoire national supérieur d'art dramatique, he made his directorial debut in 1988, with La Dispute by Marivaux at the Théâtre Pitoëff in Geneva. He is known for his innovative directing, in particular, texts by Pier Paolo Pasolini (Bêtes de style in 1992 at the Festival d'Avignon Off, Porcherie, etc.) and by Werner Schwab, and also for his direction of operas.

From 1994 to 1997, he was the artist associated with the Théâtre Nanterre-Amandiers at the invitation of Jean-Pierre Vincent and, from 1998 to 2001, he worked at the Théâtre Gérard Philipe - Centre dramatique national in Saint-Denis before leaving due to the severe financial crisis. He explained this failure, his adventures in "citizen theatre" and related his artistic journey in his interview collection, Passions civiles.

Today, he is teaching director at the high school of the Théâtre national de Bretagne. In 2008 he won the "Laurence Olivier Award" in London for the opera Pelléas et Mélisande.

Theatre 
Actor
 1990 : Shaptai by Raphaël Sadin, director Madeleine Marion
 1990 : Combat dans l’ouest by Vsevolod Vishnevsky, director Jean-Pierre Vincent
 2002 : Quai ouest by Bernard-Marie Koltès, director Jean-Christophe Saïs
 2003 : Orgia by Pier Paolo Pasolini, director Laurent Sauvage
 2004 : Pasteur Ephraïm Magnus by Hans Henny Jahnn, director Christine Letailleur
 2005 : Les Habitants by Frédéric Mauvignier, director Stanislas Nordey, Théâtre Ouvert
 2007 : Philosophy in the Bedroom by Sade, director Christine Letailleur
 2007 : Thérèse Philosophe, director Anatoly Vasiliev
 2008 : La Ballade de la geôle de Reading by Oscar Wilde, director Céline Pouillon, Maison de la Poésie
 2010 : Les Justes by Albert Camus, director Stanislas Nordey, Théâtre national de la Colline

Director
 1988 : La Dispute by Marivaux, Théâtre Pitoëff Genève, Festival d'Avignon Off
 1991 : Bête de style by Pier Paolo Pasolini, Théâtre Gérard Philipe Saint-Denis
 1992 : Le Bon Sens by Jorgos Magnotis, written for Festival d'Avignon
 1992 : La Légende de Siegfried by Stanislas Nordey, Théâtre de Sartrouville, Festival Enfantillages, Théâtre Gérard Philipe
 1992 : La Dispute by Marivaux
 1992 : Tarataba by Bernard-Marie Koltès, Théâtre Gérard Philipe
 1992 : La Conquête du pôle sud by Manfred Karge, Théâtre Vidy-Lausanne, Théâtre Gérard Philipe
 1993 : Calderon by Pier Paolo Pasolini
 1993 : Abou et Maïmouna, Festival Enfantillages
 1993 : Notes sur Pylade, Festival de Saint-Herblain
 1993 : 14 pièces piégées by Armando Llamas, Studio Théâtre du CDRC de Nantes
 1994 : Pylade by Pier Paolo Pasolini, Le Quartz, Théâtre Gérard Philipe
 1994 : Vole mon dragon by Hervé Guibert, Festival d'Avignon, Théâtre de la Bastille
 1994 : La Suffocation mécanique by Hervé Guibert, written for the Festival d'Avignon
 1994 : La Vraie Vie d'Hector F. by Stanislas Nordey, Théâtre de Sartrouville
 1995 : Splendid's by Jean Genet, Théâtre des Amandiers
 1995 : Ciment by Heiner Müller, Théâtre des Amandiers
 1995 : Un mal imaginaire by Maxime Montel, written for the Festival d'Avignon
 1995 : A Midsummer Night's Dream by William Shakespeare, Théâtre des Amandiers
 1996 : Un étrange voyage by Nazim Hikmet, Espace Malraux Chambéry, Théâtre de la Ville
 1996 : La Noce by Stanisław Wyspiański, Théâtre des Amandiers
 1997 : Contention by Didier-Georges Gabily after La Dispute by Marivaux and others, Festival d'Avignon, Théâtre des Amandiers
 1997 : Champ contrechamp by Philippe Minyana, written for Festival d'Avignon
 1997 : J'étais dans ma maison et j'attendais que la pluie vienne by Jean-Luc Lagarce, Théâtre Ouvert Paris
 1998 : Mirad, un garçon de Bosnie by Ad de Bont, Théâtre Gérard Philipe
 1998 : Tartuffe by Molière
 1998 : Les Comédies féroces by Werner Schwab
 1999 : Pigsty by Pier Paolo Pasolini, Théâtre Gérard Philipe
 1999 : Les Trois Sœurs, opera by Peter Eötvös, created by Utrecht
 2000 : Récits de naissance by Roland Fichet, Philippe Minyana and Jean-Marie Piemme, Passerelle de Saint-Brieuc
 2001 : Violences by Didier-Georges Gabily, Théâtre national de Bretagne
 2002 : L’Epreuve du feu by Magnus Dahlström, Théâtre national de Bretagne
 2003 : Atteintes à sa vie by Martin Crimp, Festival d'Avignon, Théâtre national de Bretagne
 2003 : A Flea in Her Ear by Georges Feydeau, Théâtre national de Bretagne, Théâtre de la Colline
 2004 : Le Triomphe de l'amour by Marivaux, Théâtre national de Bretagne
 2004 : Deux morceaux de verre coupant by Mario Batista, written for the Librairie de Paris
 2005 : Les Habitants by Frédéric Mauvignier, Théâtre Ouvert
 2005 : Cris by Laurent Gaudé, Théâtre Ouvert
 2005 : Le Bain by Jean-Luc Lagarce, Théâtre Ouvert
 2006 : Gênes 01 and Peanuts by Fausto Paravidino, Théâtre national de Bretagne
 2007 : Électre by Hugo von Hofmannsthal, Théâtre de la Colline
 2007 : The Screens by Jean Genet, Studio-théâtre de Vitry, Festival d'Avignon
 2007 : Incendies by Wajdi Mouawad, Théâtre National de Bretagne
 2008 : Pélleas et Mélisande by Debussy, Austria and London, Covent Garden (2008 Sir Laurence Olivier Prize)
 2008 : Sept secondes (In God we trust) by Falk Richter, Théâtre du Rond-Point
 2008 : Das System (Le Système) by Falk Richter, Festival d'Avignon, Théâtre national de Bretagne
 2010 : Les Justes by Albert Camus, Théâtre national de la Colline

Opera 
Director
 1997 : Le Rossignol by Igor Stravinsky, Théâtre du Châtelet
 1997 : Pierrot lunaire by Arnold Schoenberg, Théâtre du Châtelet
 1998 : Le Grand Macabre by György Ligeti, after Enschede
 1998 : Three Sisters by Peter Eötvös after Chekhov, Opéra de Lyon
 2000 : Kopernikus by Claude Vivier, after Banff
 2000 : Héloïse et Abélard by Ahmed Essyad, written by Opéra national du Rhin, Festival Musica Théâtre du Châtelet
 2002 : Le Balcon by Peter Eötvös after Jean Genet, created for Festival d'Aix-en-Provence
 2003 : Capuletti et Montechi by Vincenzo Bellini, Staatsoper Hannover
 2003 : Jeanne au bûcher by Arthur Honegger, Festival in the Ruhr
 2004 : Les Nègres by Michael Lévinas after Jean Genet, created by the Opéra de Lyon
 2004 : Saint François d'Assise by Olivier Messiaen, Opéra Bastille
 2008 : Melancholia by Georg Friedrich Haas, Opéra Garnier

Cinema 
Actor
 1986 : On a volé Charlie Spencer ! by Francis Huster
 1993 : Three Colors: Blue by Krzysztof Kieslowski
 1995 : Don't Forget You're Going to Die by Xavier Beauvois

Bibliography 
 Stanislas Nordey and Valérie Lang, Passions civiles, interview with Yan Ciret and Franck Laroze, Éditions La Passe du Vent, 2000 - 
  Il corpo del testo, preface by Pier Paolo Pasolini, Teatro, Milan, A. Mondadori, 2001

References

External links 

 
 Presentation by Stanislas Nordey at "theatre-contemporain.net"

1966 births
Male actors from Paris
French male film actors
French opera directors
Living people
French theatre directors
French male stage actors
French National Academy of Dramatic Arts alumni